The Yugoslavia men's national under-19 basketball team, commonly referred to as the Yugoslavia men's national junior basketball team, was the boys' basketball team, administered by Basketball Federation of Yugoslavia, that represented SFR Yugoslavia in international under-19 (under age 19) men's basketball competitions, consisting mainly of the World Championship for Junior Men.

After the dissolution of SFR Yugoslavia in 1991, the successor countries all set up their own national under-19 teams. Serbia won the Championship in 2007.

Several members of the team have been inducted into the FIBA Hall of Fame, including players Vlade Divac, Jure Zdovc and Toni Kukoč and coach Svetislav Pešić, while players Divac, Kukoč, and Dino Rađa are members of the Naismith Memorial Basketball Hall of Fame.

In 2017, 250 Steps, a film about the 1987 gold medal, was released.

Individual awards 
Most Valuable Player
 Toni Kukoč — 1987
 Dejan Bodiroga – 1991

World Championship competitive record

Coaches

Players

New national teams 
After the dissolution of SFR Yugoslavia in 1991, five new countries were created: Bosnia and Herzegovina, Croatia, Macedonia (in 2019, renamed to North Macedonia), FR Yugoslavia (in 2003, renamed to Serbia and Montenegro) and Slovenia. In 2006, Montenegro became an independent nation and Serbia became the legal successor of Serbia and Montenegro. In 2008, Kosovo declared independence from Serbia and became a FIBA member in 2015.

Here is a list of men's national under-19 teams on the SFR Yugoslavia area:
  (1992–present)
  (1992–present)
  (1993–present)
  (1992–2006)
  (2006–present)
  (2006–present)
  (2015–present)
  (1992–present)

See also 
 Yugoslavia men's national under-18 basketball team
 Yugoslavia men's national under-16 basketball team
 Yugoslavia women's national under-19 basketball team

References

M U19
M U19
Men's national under-19 basketball teams